Glu-Glu dipeptidase (alpha-glutamyl-glutamate dipeptidase, glutamylglutamic arylamidase) is an enzyme. This enzyme catalyses the following chemical reaction

 Hydrolysis of the Glu!Glu dipeptide

References

External links 
 

EC 3.4.13